is an Echizen Railway Katsuyama Eiheiji Line train station located in the town of Eiheiji, Yoshida District, Fukui Prefecture, Japan.

Lines

Station layout
The station consists of one side platform serving a single bi-directional track. The station is unattended.

Adjacent stations

History
Kōmyōji Station was opened on February 11, 1914. Operations were halted from June 25, 2001. The station reopened on July 20, 2003 as an Echizen Railway station.

Surrounding area
This station is surrounded by scattered homes and rice fields.
Other points of interest to the north:
 Kuzuryū River

See also
 List of railway stations in Japan

External links

  

Railway stations in Fukui Prefecture
Railway stations in Japan opened in 1914
Katsuyama Eiheiji Line
Eiheiji, Fukui